Stjepan Babić (born 4 December 1988) is a Croatian retired footballer who last played as a midfielder for Ethnikos Achna.

External links
 
 
 

1988 births
Living people
Footballers from Zagreb
Association football midfielders
Croatian footballers
Croatia youth international footballers
GNK Dinamo Zagreb players
NK Bjelovar players
NK Lokomotiva Zagreb players
NK Vinogradar players
FC Baltika Kaliningrad players
FC Amkar Perm players
NK Zagreb players
NK Inter Zaprešić players
NK Karlovac players
NK Rudeš players
Kaposvári Rákóczi FC players
FC Šiauliai players
NK Olimpija Ljubljana (2005) players
NK Rudar Velenje players
CS Concordia Chiajna players
NK Varaždin players
NK Tabor Sežana players
Ethnikos Achna FC players
Croatian Football League players
Russian Premier League players
Nemzeti Bajnokság I players
A Lyga players
Slovenian PrvaLiga players
Liga I players
Cypriot First Division players
Croatian expatriate footballers
Expatriate footballers in Russia
Expatriate footballers in Hungary
Expatriate footballers in Lithuania
Expatriate footballers in Slovenia
Expatriate footballers in Romania
Expatriate footballers in Cyprus
Croatian expatriate sportspeople in Russia
Croatian expatriate sportspeople in Hungary
Croatian expatriate sportspeople in Slovenia
Croatian expatriate sportspeople in Romania
Croatian expatriate sportspeople in Cyprus